The 2011–12 Belgian Elite League is a competition between eight Belgian rugby teams. It started on 17 September 2011 and ended with a final game on 12 May 2012 at the King Baudouin Stadium. The competition was won by Rugby Ottignies Club who beat the Royal Kituro Rugby Club in the final game with a score of 20–6.

Season table

{| class="wikitable" width="450px" style="float:left; font-size:95%; margin-left:15px;"
| colspan="2"  style="text-align:center; background:#fff;" cellpadding="0" cellspacing="0"|Key to colours
|-
| style="background: #3fff00;" |     
| Champions
|-
| style="background:#ccf;"|     
|Participants in Championship Playoffs
|-
| style="background: #ff79B4;" |     
|Bottom team is relegated to Division 2.
|}

Championship playoffs

External links
 Site of the Belgian Rugby Federation

2011-12
2011–12 in European rugby union leagues